Simon Cottle is professor of media and communications at the School of Journalism, Media and Cultural Studies (JOMEC) at Cardiff University. He writes on media, the communication of conflicts, crises and catastrophes, and globalization. He holds honorary professorships at the University of Melbourne and the University of Tasmania.

Selected publications

References

Further reading
Curriculum Vitae

External links

Living people
English journalists
English political journalists
English male non-fiction writers
Alumni of the University of Birmingham
Alumni of the University of Sussex
Year of birth missing (living people)